Fighter Squadron 33, or VF-33, was an aviation unit of the United States Navy. Originally established as Escort-Scouting Squadron 16 or VGS-16 on 6 August 1942, it was redesignated as Composite Squadron 16 or VC-16 on 1 March 1943, redesignated as VF-33 on 15 August 1943, and disestablished on 19 November 1945. It was the first US Navy squadron to be designated as VF-33.

Operational history
VF-33, equipped with F6F Hellcats, was first deployed to Munda where they supported the New Georgia Campaign.

While deployed in the Solomons, VF-33 was credited with 60 Japanese aircraft shot down, and produced three aces: Lt.(jg) Frank E. Schnieder with seven kills, Lt. C. K. Hildebrandt with five kills, and Lt.(jg) James J. Kinsella also with five kills, three with VF-33 and two with VF-72 in the F4F-4 Wildcat.

See also
History of the United States Navy
List of inactive United States Navy aircraft squadrons
List of United States Navy aircraft squadrons

References

Strike fighter squadrons of the United States Navy